This is a list of Monuments of National Importance as officially recognized by the Archaeological Survey of India  (ASI) in the Indian state of Maharashtra falling under the jurisdiction of its Mumbai (ASI circle).

|}

See also

 List of State Protected Monuments in Maharashtra
 List of Monuments of National Importance in India
 Heritage structures in Mumbai

References

External links

Monuments of National Importance, Mumbai
Monuments of National Importance, Mumbai
Monuments of National Importance
Monuments of National Importance